Danish wine is wine made in Denmark.

Grapes 
Despite its northerly location, Denmark has been fostering a developing wine industry since the late 20th century that has benefited from global warming and the legalization of wine production in 1999. Today there are small vineyards in Jutland, Lolland, Funen and Northern Zealand growing various grape varieties, mainly Cabernet Cortis and Cabernet Cantor. In 2006 the twenty vineyards in the country together produced around 40,000 bottles of wine. In 2007, Danish wine gained prominence when a 2006 Dons Cuvée sparkling wine from Skæresøgård Vin won a silver medal in the 2007 Effervescents du Monde wine competition.

Other fruits 
Denmark has been a producer of fruit wines for many years, especially cherry wines (Danish: kirsebærvin) and apple wines (Danish: æblevin). The Danish climate is very well suited for growing these fruits and the country has a quite large variety of unique cultivars. In particular the Danish Cherry Heering liquor wine is well known abroad and, since 2006, new producers at Frederiksdal Manor on Lolland has experimented with cherry wines, with much praised results.

References

External links

A BBC News story about the Skæresøgård Vin vineyard in Jutland back in 2002

 
Wine